The 2018 Campeonato Carioca Série B1 was the 38th edition of the main division of football in Rio de Janeiro. The contest is organized by FERJ. from 2018, in Campeonato Carioca Série B will called Série B1. The main novelty for a season will be an inclusion of the two times demoted in the 2018 Campeonato Carioca.

Participating teams

Championship round

Taça Santos Dumont
Group A

Group B

 Knockout stage

Final

Taça Corcovado
Group A

Group B

 Knockout stage

Final

Overall table

Final stage

Final

References

Campeonato Carioca seasons
2018 in Brazilian football leagues